Mountain Valley Spring Water is an American brand of spring water bottled in Hot Springs, Arkansas. It has been bottled continuously since 1871 and is currently owned by Clear Mountain Spring Water Company of Little Rock, Arkansas. Mountain Valley Spring Water is distributed across the United States.

History
Mountain Valley water originates at a protected spring just west of Highway 7 North, approximately twelve miles from downtown Hot Springs. In 1871, pharmacist Peter E. Greene and his brother, John Greene, were the first to sell Mountain Valley Spring Water, which was then known in the Hot Springs area as “Lockett’s Spring Water” because of its association with Benjamin Lockett and his son, Enoch. The brothers renamed the water Mountain Valley after a small community nearby. In 1883, the Mountain Valley Water Company was officially formed, with Zeb Ward, G. G. Latta, Samuel Fordyce, and Samuel Stitt House as principal investors and company officers, and Peter Greene remaining as local manager.

Ownership of the spring was transferred in 1902, when August Schlafly of St. Louis, Missouri, already a major stockholder in the company, and his family became sole owners. By 1908, franchise offices had followed in Chicago, Illinois, and New York City. An apocryphal tale holds that two strangers, traveling home to New York from Hot Springs by train, were in the dining car, and each produced a bottle of Mountain Valley for his respective table. This coincidence led to many conversations and then an agreement to form a fifty-fifty partnership for a Mountain Valley Water Company franchise in New York. Upon exchanging business cards, media mogul William Randolph Hearst discovered that his new partner was the well-known gambler Richard Canfield, a man against whom his newspapers were conducting a fierce campaign.

By the 1920s, Mountain Valley Water was being served in the United States Senate, and in 1928, distribution began in California, making Mountain Valley the first bottled water to be available coast to coast. In 1924, Schlafly purchased the DeSoto Springs Mineral Water Company, located at 150 Central Avenue in Hot Springs. The two-story, classical revival brick building was built specifically to house a mineral water depot. A third level was added in 1921 to house a Japanese-themed dance hall with accommodations for a live band. The building remained the DeSoto Spring Water Depot and DeSoto Dance Hall until 1936, when Mountain Valley Water Company made the building its national headquarters and visitor center.

In 1966, the Schlafly's sold the company to a group of distributors under the leadership of James G. Scott. The company's headquarters were moved to Paramus, New Jersey, and the historic Mountain Valley building was closed. In April 1987, Sammons Enterprises of Dallas, Texas, purchased the company and returned administrative operations to Hot Springs. Sammons sold the company in April 2004 to its current private ownership.

New York-based co-op Brand Co., illustrator Two Arms Inc., and Colorado-based Land Design collaborated to create the new image and branding for the company in 2016.

Health benefits
In an effort to discover what ingredient or ingredients made this spring water different from its competitors and beneficial to those with chronic disorders, the company encouraged the clinical and biochemical study of the water and its possible therapeutic effects in the 1920s and 1930s. Clinical tests at hospitals in New York, St. Louis, and Philadelphia demonstrated improvements in the health of patients with kidney and liver disorders and rheumatism as a result of drinking Mountain Valley Water. Studies after World War II in facilities in New York, Cincinnati, Chicago, St. Louis, and Houston further investigated the connection between the low-sodium content of the water and its alkaline buffering ability. The extensive testing of the spring water enabled the company to present a strong and successful defense to the 1956 allegations by the Food and Drug Administration that its advertising claims were too broad and exaggerated.

Awards
Mountain Valley is America's most-awarded spring water, having won 19 honors from the Berkeley Springs International Water Tasting since the organization's inception in 1991.

1992 
3rd - Sparkling
Mountain Valley Sparkling Spring Water, Hot Springs, AR

1997 
1st (tied) - Bottled Non-Carbonated
Mountain Valley Spring Water, Hot Springs, AR

1997 
2nd - Sparkling
Mountain Valley Sparkling Spring Water, Hot Springs, AR

1998 
2nd - Sparkling
Mountain Valley Sparkling Spring Water, Hot Springs, AR

1999 
4th - Sparkling
Mountain Valley Sparkling Spring Water, Hot Springs, AR

2000 
4th - Bottled Non-Carbonated
Mountain Valley Spring Water, Hot Springs, AR

2000 
2nd (tied) - Sparkling
Mountain Valley Sparkling Spring Water, Hot Springs, AR

2002 
5th - Bottled Non-Carbonated
Mountain Valley Spring Water, Hot Springs, AR

2003 
Bottled Non-Carbonated Water 
Gold Medal: Mountain Valley Spring Water, Hot Springs, AR

2008 
People's Choice Package Design
5th Place: Mountain Valley Vintage Glass, Hot Springs, AR

2011 
Carbonated Bottled Water
Silver Medal: Mountain Valley Spring Water, Hot Springs, AR

2012 
Carbonated Bottled Water
5th Place: Mountain Valley Spring Water, Hot Springs, AR

2018 
Best Bottled Water 2018
2nd—Mountain Valley Springs Water, Hot Springs, AR

2019 
Best Flavored Essence Sparkling 
1st – Mountain Valley Blackberry Pomegranate Sparkling Water. Hot Springs, AR

2019 
Best Flavored Essence Sparkling
3rd – Mountain Valley White Peach Sparkling Water, Hot Springs, AR

2019 
Best Sparkling – 2019 
1st – Mountain Valley Spring Water Sparkling, Hot Springs, AR

2020 
Best Sparkling – 2020
3rd – Mountain Valley Spring Water Sparkling, Hot Springs, AR

2020 
Best Flavored Essence Sparkling 
3rd– Mountain Valley Blackberry Pomegranate Sparkling Water. Hot Springs, AR

2021 
Best Sparkling - 2021
5th (tied) Mountain Valley Sparkling Spring Water, Hot Springs, AR

Notable connoisseurs
Every United States President from Calvin Coolidge to Bill Clinton served Mountain Valley Spring Water in the White House. Following a heart attack in 1955, President Dwight Eisenhower drank the water on the advice of his physician. Other notable connoisseurs of the water included Elvis Presley and boxing champions Joe Louis, Gene Tunney, and Sugar Ray Robinson.Consumption of the water has not been limited to humans: thoroughbreds such as Secretariat, Nashua, Kelso, Bold Ruler, and Sunday Silence were trained on this spring water.

P. Allen Smith serves Mountain Valley Spring and Sparkling Water at his garden home.

Mountain Valley Spring and Sparkling Waters are the official bottled waters of the Southern Foodways Alliance and the Society of Hickory Golfers.

Legal and environmental issues
Because of the environmental impact of bottled water and the lack of any proven benefits of it compared to municipal tap water, states are increasingly banning its purchase using state funds. For example, states including New York will not allow state money to be used to purchase bottled water for any State events at state-funded institutions. California and Massachusetts have similar laws preventing the use of taxpayer funds on these products.

In popular culture
Mountain Valley Spring Water has a long show business tradition that dates back to Gloria Swanson. Mountain Valley Spring Water was featured on screen in the convenience store in John Carpenter's The Fog. Today, Mountain Valley shares the screen with stars such as Tom Cruise, Demi Moore, Paul Reiser, and Ashley Judd.

On television, Mountain Valley has been featured in episodes of Parks and Recreation and Happily Divorced.

References

 http://www.encyclopediaofarkansas.net/encyclopedia/entry-detail.aspx?entryID=2148
 http://www.berkeleysprings.com/water/awards2.htm
 http://www.foodbev.com/news/mountain-valley-spring-water-packs-in-25-rpet
 http://cityroom.blogs.nytimes.com/2009/05/05/state-agencies-to-phase-out-use-of-bottled-water/

External links
 Official Site

Bottled water brands